Malden Center station is a Massachusetts Bay Transportation Authority (MBTA) intermodal transit station in Malden, Massachusetts. Located on an elevated grade above Pleasant Street in downtown Malden, it serves the rapid transit Orange Line and the MBTA Commuter Rail Haverhill Line. The station has one island platform for the two Orange Line tracks and a single side platform for the single commuter rail track. Two busways are used by 13 MBTA bus routes. 

The Boston and Maine Railroad opened through Malden in 1845. The original station was replaced in 1871, then again by a brick structure in 1892. The station building was sold for private use in 1958, but commuter trains continued to stop until the modern station opened in December 1975. Commuter trains stopped at the modern station from 1977 to 1979, and have stopped since 1985. A renovation in 2003–2005 added two elevators, making the station accessible.

Station layout

Malden Center station is located on an embankment on the west side of downtown Malden. The Orange Line is on the west side of the station, with two tracks and an island platform. The Western Route, used by the Haverhill Line, has one track and a single side platform. The fare lobby is under the center of the platforms, with entrances from both sides of the tracks. A two-lane busway is located on the east side of the station, with a one-lane busway on the west side.

History

The Boston and Maine Railroad (B&M) opened through Malden in July 1845. The first station was a two-story wooden depot on the east side of the tracks at Pleasant Street; it was replaced by a smaller station on the west side in 1871. In May 1891, the B&M began construction of a new station as part of a grade crossing elimination project. The new station opened in 1892. In 1958, the station building was purchased from the B&M for just $1,000. It was renovated for use as a restaurant and banquet hall, which opened by 1962.

Malden Center station opened on December 27, 1975, as part of the MBTA's Haymarket North Extension of the Orange Line. Expansion to Malden had been a long-time goal of the Boston Elevated Railway, and the Everett extension of the Charlestown Elevated was originally planned to go past Everett and into Malden and Reading via Main Street. However, residents of Malden were opposed to the elevated railroad structure that was planned, and prevented the extension. The 1975 extension was built along the existing Western Route embankment rather than Main Street.

The former station platform closed simultaneously with the opening of the Orange Line station. A high-level platform - the first on the MBTA system - was installed along the Reading Line track, but Reading Line trains did not stop. The platform opened for regular service on May 1, 1977, but closed again on September 1, 1979. North Station reopened on April 20, 1985; the commuter platform at Oak Grove closed but the platform at Malden was reopened. The switch may have been made due to a request by John A. Brennan Jr., who was then constructing a large development near Malden Center station.

Because of its Orange Line connection, Malden Center can serve as a temporary inbound terminus for the Haverhill Line when commuter rail service is disrupted between Malden and Boston's North Station. It served this role in 2016 during reconstruction work on the Woods Memorial Bridge, which carries the Revere Beach Parkway over the rail lines and the Malden River. Oak Grove station is usually used during weekday disruptions, as it is closer to the double-track section of the line in Melrose.

Renovations
Unlike most MBTA stations, air rights over the station are owned by the city rather than by the MBTA. By 1983, the city planned to built a footbridge to connect the station to nearby developments. In 1989, the MBTA studied a possible accessible footbridge at the station, which would have cost $2.8 million and opened in 1991. 

The station was not initially accessible, but it was built with provisions for a future elevator. The MBTA began a renovation of the station, then estimated to cost $6 million, in 2003. It was originally to be completed in 2003, but was substantially delayed by changes to building codes. Completed in 2005, the ultimately-$10 million project added a second exit stairwell and two elevators, making the station accessible. The station also has two benches in the lobby painted by local arts students. 

Changes to wayfinding signage, lighting, and other station improvements were completed by May 2021. The entire Orange Line, including Malden Center station, was closed from August 19 to September 18, 2022, during maintenance work. The Haverhill Line continued to stop at Malden Center during that time.

Bus connections

Malden Center is a major bus transfer station, with 13 routes serving the station via its two busways.

: Malden Center station–
: Woodland Road–Wellington station
: Malden Center station– via Winter Hill
: Malden Center station–Sullivan Square station via Ferry Street
: Malden Center station–Sullivan Square station via Newland Street Housing
: Lebanon Loop–Wellington station
: Linden Square–Wellington station
: Melrose Highlands– or Malden Center station
: Redstone Shopping Center–Malden Center station
: Reading Depot–Malden Center station via Lowell Street
: Reading Depot–Malden Center station via North Avenue
: Kennedy Drive or Jack Satter House–Malden Center station
: Saugus Center–Malden Center station

References

External links

MBTA–Malden Center
 Commercial Street entrance from Google Maps Street View

Orange Line (MBTA) stations
Railway stations in Middlesex County, Massachusetts
Stations along Boston and Maine Railroad lines
Railway stations in the United States opened in 1975
MBTA Commuter Rail stations in Middlesex County, Massachusetts